Linn Opderbecke is a New Hampshire politician.

Education
Opderbecke earned a B.A. in social psychology from St. Olaf College.

Career
Opderbecke is a retired Lutheran pastor. On November 8, 2016, Opderbecke was elected to the New Hampshire House of Representatives where he represented the Strafford 15 district until December 2, 2020. Opderbecke is a Democrat.

Personal life
Opderbecke resides in Dover, New Hampshire. Opderbecke is married and has two children.

References

Living people
American Lutherans
St. Olaf College alumni
People from Dover, New Hampshire
Democratic Party members of the New Hampshire House of Representatives
21st-century American politicians
Year of birth missing (living people)